Public Affairs Quarterly is a peer-reviewed academic journal that covers current issues in social and political philosophy. The current editor is Jason Brennan (Georgetown University).

External links 
 

Quarterly journals
University of Illinois Press academic journals
Publications established in 1987
Social philosophy journals
Political philosophy journals
English-language journals